Crinifer is a genus of birds in the turaco family. They are restricted to Africa. Formerly, the genus only contained the plaintain-eaters, but in 2021 go-away-birds were merged into the genus.

They are large noisy and conspicuous birds, but lack the brilliant colours of their relatives. They are mainly grey, with a long tail and an erectile head crest. They feed on fruit, especially figs, seeds and other vegetable matter.

Unlike many of the brighter forest dwelling turacos these are birds of African open country and have drab grey and white plumage. In Southern Africa these birds are known as kwêvoëls, though they are also called loeries along with the other turacos.

The go-away-birds are named for their raucous "go away" call.

The genus was erected by the Polish zoologist Feliks Paweł Jarocki in 1821 with the western plantain-eater (Crinifer piscator) as the type species. The name combines the Latin crinis meaning "hair" and -fer meaning "bearing".

The genus now contains five species:.

References 

Crinifer
Taxa named by Feliks Paweł Jarocki